
Hysterica is a heavy metal band from Stockholm, Sweden. The band was founded in 2005. They recorded their first demo in 2006 which met with critical appraise. After several years of playing live gigs they finally released their first album MetalWar in 2009. Besides Sweden, Hysterica have toured in the Netherlands, Belgium, Germany, the UK and Russia. They performed at the 2009 Sweden Rock Festival. The band won the award for Newcomer in the Swedish Metal Awards in 2010.

Discography

Albums
 Metalwar (2009)
 The Art of Metal (2012)
 "All In" (2015)

Demos
 Hysterica - (2006)

References

External links 
 Official Homepage
 Hysterica on Myspace
 Hysterica on MusicBrainz
 Hysterica on Facebook
 Hysterica on Nöjestorget

Swedish heavy metal musical groups
All-female bands
Musical groups established in 2005